Talciona is a village in Tuscany, central Italy, in the comune of Poggibonsi, province of Siena. At the time of the 2001 census its population was 43.

Talciona is about 35 km from Siena and 6 km from Poggibonsi.

References 

Frazioni of Poggibonsi